Thorapadi may refer to:

 Thorapadi, Vellore
 Puthupet, also known as Thorapadi, Cuddalore